Autonomous concepts is a principle in the judicial interpretation of the European Convention on Human Rights and European Union law.

References

European Union law
Legal interpretation
European Court of Human Rights